Gauville is the name or part of the name of the following communes in France:

 Gauville, Orne, in the Orne department
 Gauville, Somme, in the Somme department
 Gauville-la-Campagne, in the Eure department